James D. Parker (born December 3, 1975, in Biloxi, Mississippi) is a retired American track and field athlete who specialized in the hammer throw. He represented the United States at the 2004 Summer Olympics without making the final. He won the silver medal at the 2003 Pan American Games.

Parker served as first lieutenant with the U.S. Air Force.

Competition record

References

External links 
 
 
 
 
 

1975 births
Living people
Sportspeople from Biloxi, Mississippi
American male hammer throwers
Male weight throwers
Olympic track and field athletes of the United States
Athletes (track and field) at the 2004 Summer Olympics
Pan American Games medalists in athletics (track and field)
Pan American Games silver medalists for the United States
Athletes (track and field) at the 2003 Pan American Games
Track and field athletes from Mississippi
United States Air Force World Class Athlete Program
United States Air Force Athlete of the Year
Medalists at the 2003 Pan American Games
21st-century American people